Collin Ashton (born July 24, 1983) is an American football linebacker.

High school football
Ashton played at Mission Viejo High School.

College football
Ashton played college football at the University of Southern California where he graduated in 2006.  He was a walk-on player who earned a scholarship.  A feel good story as a fifth generation USC Scion (meaning his relatives were alumni), he had been to every USC Trojans game since birth.

Professional career
Since Ashton was not drafted in the 2006 NFL Draft he was a free agent pick up by the National Football League San Diego Chargers in May 2006 and released by the San Diego Chargers in June 2006. Ashton then unsuccessfully tried out for the Baltimore Ravens. In 2007, he played as middle linebacker for the Flash de la Courneuve in Paris (France) where he won the national title.

References

1983 births
Living people
American football linebackers
San Diego Chargers players
USC Trojans football players
Sportspeople from Mission Viejo, California
Players of American football from California
Mission Viejo High School alumni